Frederick William Hargreaves (16 August 1858 – 5 April 1897) was an English footballer who represented the England national football team. He also played first-class cricket with Lancashire.

A member of the Malvern College 1st XI team, Hargreaves played his club football for the Blackburn Rovers and was a midfielder in their team which lost the 1882 FA Cup Final. His first international cap for England came in 1880 when he took the field against Wales, with England winning 3–2. The following year he made an appearance in another international against Wales but this time finished on the losing side. In 1882, he claimed his third and final cap in a convincing 13–0 victory over Ireland. As of January 2013, this remains England's highest ever winning margin.

His brother John Hargreaves also played at Blackburn and represented England.

An amateur cricketer who was previously a member of Malvern's First Eleven Cricket team, he appeared in his only first-class cricket match in 1881, against Derbyshire. Hargreaves was dismissed by George Osborne for a duck in his only innings and took a couple of catches. He played club cricket at Blackburn's East Lancashire Cricket Club.

References

External links
Cricinfo: Frederick Hargreaves

1858 births
1897 deaths
English footballers
England international footballers
Blackburn Rovers F.C. players
English cricketers
Lancashire cricketers
People educated at Malvern College
Cricketers from Blackburn
Footballers from Blackburn
Association footballers not categorized by position
FA Cup Final players